Maxim Krivonozhkin (born 18 February 1984) is a Russian professional ice hockey forward currently playing for HC Sibir Novosibirsk of the Kontinental Hockey League.

Career statistics

External links

1984 births
Living people
Amur Khabarovsk players
Beibarys Atyrau players
Buran Voronezh players
HC CSK VVS Samara players
HC Lada Togliatti players
HC Sibir Novosibirsk players
HC Yugra players
Kristall Saratov players
Russian ice hockey forwards
Toros Neftekamsk players
Traktor Chelyabinsk players
Yertis Pavlodar players
Sportspeople from Saratov